The Penn Mile Stakes is a Grade II American Thoroughbred horse race for horses aged three years old, held over a distance of one mile on the turf annually in late May or early June at Penn National Race Course, Grantville, Pennsylvania.  The event currently carries a purse of $400,000.

History

With the influx of additional funds from the Penn National Race Course turning itself to a Racino the club ventured in adding higher stakes races. The race was inaugurated in 2013 with a stakes purse of $500,000.

In 2015 the event was classified as Grade III and in 2017 was upgraded to Grade II.

The event in 2020  was not held due to the COVID-19 pandemic in the United States with Penn National closed when the event was to be scheduled.

Due to weather conditions and the state of the track the 2021 running was moved to the dirt and the event was downgraded to Grade III.

Records
Speed record: 
1:33.99 – Rydilluc (2013)

Largest margin of victory:
 3 lengths  – Hawkish (2018)

Most wins by a jockey:
 No jockey has won this race more than once.

Most wins by a trainer:
 2  – Mark E. Casse (2016, 2019)

Most wins by an owner:
 No owner has won this race more than once.

Winners

Legend:

See also
 List of American and Canadian Graded races

References

Horse races in Pennsylvania
Flat horse races for three-year-olds
Graded stakes races in the United States
Open mile category horse races
Grantville, Pennsylvania
Recurring sporting events established in 2013
2013 establishments in Pennsylvania
Grade 2 stakes races in the United States